For Most of It I Have No Words: Genocide, Landscape, Memory, is a book by photographer Simon Norfolk published in 1998 by Dewi Lewis. With an introductory essay by Michael Ignatieff, the book documents the human traces left behind in the aftermath of genocide. Photographs in the book were taken by Norfolk in various locations, including Rwanda, Cambodia, Vietnam, Auschwitz, Dresden, Ukraine, Armenia and Namibia.

An exhibition of the same title including photographs from the book was exhibited at venues including the Imperial War Museum, London.

Images from the book are kept as photographic prints in the permanent collections at the Museum of Fine Arts, Houston, the Hyman Collection, and Portland Art Museum.

References

1998 non-fiction books
Photographic collections and books
British non-fiction books